Charlotte Leys (born 18 March 1989) is a Belgian female volleyball player. She was a member of the Belgium women's national volleyball team and played for Atom Trefl Sopot in 2014. Now she's a member of the Hermes Volley Oostende in the new season (2021-2022) She also was part of the Belgian national team at the 2014 FIVB Volleyball Women's World Championship in Italy, and 2015 FIVB World Grand Prix.

Clubs
  Asterix Kieldrecht (2007–2010)
  Pałac Bydgoszcz (2010–2011)
  MKS Dąbrowa Górnicza (volleyball) (2011–2013)
  Atom Trefl Sopot (2013–2015)
  Galatasaray İstanbul (2015–2017)
   Bursa Büyükşehir Belediyespor  (2017-2021)
  Hermes Volley Oostende (2021-2022)

References

1989 births
 Living people
 Belgian women's volleyball players
 Place of birth missing (living people)
 Volleyball players at the 2015 European Games
 European Games competitors for Belgium
 Galatasaray S.K. (women's volleyball) players
20th-century Belgian women
21st-century Belgian women